The 1992 UC Davis football team represented the University of California, Davis as a member of the Northern California Athletic Conference (NCAC) during the 1992 NCAA Division II football season. Led Bob Foster in his fourth and final season as head coach, UC Davis compiled an overall record of 8–2–1 with a mark of 5–0 in conference play, winning the NCAC title for the 21st time in 22 season. 1992 was the 23rd consecutive winning season for the Aggies. The team outscored its opponents 395 to 320 for the season. The Aggies played home games at Toomey Field in Davis, California.

This was the last season UC Davis competed in the NCAC. In 1993, they moved to the American West Conference (AWC).

Schedule

References

UC Davis
UC Davis Aggies football seasons
Northern California Athletic Conference football champion seasons
UC Davis Aggies football